Braxton is the given name of:

Men
Braxton Beacham (1864–1924), American politician
Braxton Berrios (born 1995), American football player
Braxton Bragg (1817–1876), American general
Braxton Cook (born 1991), American musician
Braxton Craven (1822–1882), American educator
Braxton Davidson (born 1996), American baseball player
Braxton Garrett (born 1997), American baseball player
Braxton Hoyett (born 1996), American football player
Braxton Jones (born 1999), American football player
Braxton Kelley (born 1986), American football player
Braxton Key (born 1997), American basketball player
Braxton Lee (born 1993), American baseball player
Braxton Miller (born 1992), American football player
Braxton Mitchell (born 2000), American politician
Braxton Pope, American filmmaker
Braxton Powell (1944–2010), American politician

Women
 Braxton Stone-Papadopoulos (born 1995), Canadian wrestler

English masculine given names